Rian Agung Saputro (born 25 June 1990) is an Indonesian badminton player. He was partnered with Angga Pratama in men's doubles, but split after the 2014 Asian Games. Saputro was then partnered with Berry Angriawan. They debuted at the 2014 Hong Kong Super Series. They won their first Grand Prix Gold title at the 2015 Indonesian Masters. In 2016, he was paired with former Olympic gold medalist, Hendra Setiawan. Saputro was then paired with Setiawan's former partner, Mohammad Ahsan. Ahsan and Saputro's first international title was in 2017 China International. They later won silver at the 2017 BWF World Championships.

Achievements

BWF World Championships 
Men's doubles

Southeast Asian Games 
Men's doubles

BWF Superseries (1 runner-up) 
The BWF Superseries, which was launched on 14 December 2006 and implemented in 2007, was a series of elite badminton tournaments, sanctioned by the Badminton World Federation (BWF). BWF Superseries levels were Superseries and Superseries Premier. A season of Superseries consisted of twelve tournaments around the world that had been introduced since 2011. Successful players were invited to the Superseries Finals, which were held at the end of each year.

Men's doubles

  BWF Superseries Finals tournament
  BWF Superseries Premier tournament
  BWF Superseries tournament

BWF Grand Prix (6 titles, 3 runners-up) 
The BWF Grand Prix had two levels, the Grand Prix and Grand Prix Gold. It was a series of badminton tournaments sanctioned by the Badminton World Federation (BWF) and played between 2007 and 2017.

Men's doubles

  BWF Grand Prix Gold tournament
  BWF Grand Prix tournament

BWF International Challenge/Series (3 titles, 3 runners-up) 
Men's doubles

Mixed doubles

  BWF International Challenge tournament
  BWF International Series tournament

Performance timeline

National team 
 Senior level

Individual competitions

Men's doubles 
 Senior level

Mixed doubles

Record against selected opponents 
Men's doubles results against World Superseries finalists, World Superseries Finals semifinalists, World Championships semifinalists, and Olympic quarterfinalists paired with:

Mohammad Ahsan

  Chai Biao & Hong Wei 0–1
  Li Junhui & Liu Yuchen 1–1
  Liu Cheng & Zhang Nan 0–1
  Mathias Boe & Carsten Mogensen ''0–1
  Hendra Setiawan &  Tan Boon Heong 1–0
  Ricky Karanda Suwardi & Angga Pratama 1–0
  Takeshi Kamura & Keigo Sonoda 1–1
  Goh V Shem & Tan Wee Kiong 1–0

Berry Angriawan

  Chai Biao & Hong Wei 1–1
  Fu Haifeng & Zhang Nan 0–1
  Liu Xiaolong & Qiu Zihan 0–1
  Marcus Fernaldi Gideon & Kevin Sanjaya Sukamuljo 1–0
  Ricky Karanda Suwardi & Angga Pratama 0–2
  Hirokatsu Hashimoto & Noriyasu Hirata 0–1
  Takeshi Kamura & Keigo Sonoda 2–2
  Hiroyuki Endo & Kenichi Hayakawa 0–2
  Kim Gi-jung & Kim Sa-rang 1–2
  Ko Sung-hyun & Shin Baek-cheol 0–1
  Lee Yong-dae & Yoo Yeon-seong 0–1
  Koo Kien Keat & Tan Boon Heong 1–1

Angga Pratama

  Cai Yun & Fu Haifeng 2–1
  Chai Biao & Guo Zhendong 1–2
  Chai Biao & Hong Wei 1–0
  Hong Wei & Shen Ye 0–2
  Liu Xiaolong & Qiu Zihan 3–1
  Lee Sheng-mu & Tsai Chia-hsin 0–2
  Jonas Rasmussen & Mads Conrad-Petersen 0–1
  Mads Pieler Kolding & Mads Conrad-Petersen 2–1
  Mathias Boe & Carsten Mogensen 0–3
  Bona Septano & Muhammad Ahsan 1–2
  Hendra Aprida Gunawan & Alvent Yulianto Chandra 1–1
  Markis Kido & Hendra Setiawan 0–2
  Muhammad Ahsan & Hendra Setiawan 1–1
  Hirokatsu Hashimoto & Noriyasu Hirata 1–4
  Hiroyuki Endo & Kenichi Hayakawa 2–4
  Takeshi Kamura & Keigo Sonoda 0–1
  Cho Gun-woo & Kwon Yi-goo 0–2
  Jung Jae-sung & Lee Yong-dae 1–1
  Kim Gi-jung & Kim Sa-rang 0–4
  Ko Sung-hyun & Lee Yong-dae 0–1
  Ko Sung-hyun & Shin Baek-cheol 0–1
  Lee Yong-dae & Yoo Yeon-seong 1–2
  Mohd Zakry Abdul Latif & Mohd Fairuzizuan Mohd Tazari 1–1
  Koo Kien Keat & Tan Boon Heong 1–1
  Hoon Thien How & Tan Wee Kiong 1–0
  Bodin Isara & Maneepong Jongjit 0–2

References

External links 
 
 PBSI profile 

1990 births
Living people
People from Karanganyar Regency
Sportspeople from Central Java
Indonesian male badminton players
Badminton players at the 2014 Asian Games
Asian Games competitors for Indonesia
Competitors at the 2013 Southeast Asian Games
Southeast Asian Games gold medalists for Indonesia
Southeast Asian Games medalists in badminton
Universiade gold medalists for Indonesia
Universiade medalists in badminton
Medalists at the 2011 Summer Universiade
21st-century Indonesian people
20th-century Indonesian people